Abayomi Aderibigbe  professionally known as Yomi Black is a Nigerian actor, and filmmaker, best known for his role as Sunday in the hit online comedy skit series Sunday & Lolade alongside Kiki Omeili, which made its theatrical debut as the first Nigerian comedy skit series to premiere at the cinemas.

Career

Yomi Black started out as a Radio presenter for Rhythm 93.7 FM Lagos. He then went on to produce 15 editions of a shopping magazine, “Window Shopping Magazine”, after which he branched out into producing Movies, Comedy Skits, Documentary, Advertising, Shows, and Photography and by 2009, he had earned a reputation as a celebrity photographer.

In 2011 Yomi Black began producing a music review show called Radio Hit Show (RHS) with 160 successful episodes.

In 2013, he started his online TV platform on YouTube called VHS (Video Hit Show), a short form comedy series with over 200 videos produced and counting, it was on this platform that he began producing the critically acclaimed comedy skit, Sunday & Lolade featuring Kiki Omeili. In 2017, the series was adapted for the big screen and premiered in Nigerian cinemas nationwide, breaking the digital conventions that regulated its creation, making it the first Nigerian comedy skit to have a theatrical release.

In February 2018, Yomi Black announced that he had begun production of a 12-episode television series, Room 420 starring a host of notable Nigerian television and film stars including, MTV Shuga Naija star Timini Egbuson, Jide Kosoko, and Toni Tones.

Personal life

In 2012, Yomi Black married Elizabeth John in Abuja. The two had met on the set of the season 2 of the Nigerian premiere business reality TV show, The Intern and hit it off. In 2021, it was reported that after nine years of marriage, the two had separated. They share a son together.

Awards and recognition

In 2013, one of his comedy skits, Lagos Big Girls Games was listed as the 4th most watched video on Youtube in Nigeria. Yomi Black was also awarded the Vlogger of the Year at the 2016 City People Entertainment Awards.

Filmography

Directorial Credits

Production Credits

Acting Credits

References 

Nigerian film producers
Nigerian radio people
1982 births
Living people
Nigerian male television actors
Yoruba actors